A natural material is any product or physical matter that comes from plants, animals, or the ground which is not man-made. Minerals and the metals that can be extracted from them (without further modification) are also considered to belong into this category. Natural materials are used as building materials and clothing. Types include:

 Biotic materials
 Wood (rattan, bamboo, bark, etc.)

 Plant fiber (coir, ramie, sisal, cotton, flax, hemp, jute, kapok, kenaf, moss, linen, abacá, etc.)

 Animal fiber (wool, silk, alpaca, camel, angora, cashmere, mohair, etc.)

 Inorganic material
 Stone (flint, granite, obsidian, sandstone, sand, gems, glass, etc.)
 Native metal (copper, iron, gold, silver, etc.)
 Composites (clay, plasticine, etc.)
 Other natural materials.
 Soil

See also 
 Natural product
 Earth structure
 Material science
 Natural resources
 Metamaterials

References

Further reading